The 2017 Ricoh Open was a tennis tournament played on outdoor grass courts. It was the 28th edition of the Rosmalen Grass Court Championships, and part of the 250 Series of the 2017 ATP World Tour, and of the WTA International tournaments of the 2017 WTA Tour. Both the men's and the women's events took place at the Autotron park in Rosmalen, 's-Hertogenbosch in the Netherlands, from June 12 through June 18, 2017.

CoCo Vandeweghe was the defending champion, but lost in the first round to Carina Witthöft. Unseeded Anett Kontaveit won her first WTA title, defeating Natalia Vikhlyantseva in the final, 6–2, 6–3.

Seeds

Draw

Finals

Top half
{{16TeamBracket-Compact-Tennis3-Byes 
| RD1=First round
| RD2=Second round
| RD3=Quarterfinals
| RD4=Semifinals

| RD1-seed01=1/WC
| RD1-team01= D Cibulková
| RD1-score01-1=5
| RD1-score01-2=6
| RD1-score01-3=4
| RD1-seed02=Q
| RD1-team02= A Lottner
| RD1-score02-1=7
| RD1-score02-2=2
| RD1-score02-3=6

| RD1-seed03=Q
| RD1-team03= M Kato
| RD1-score03-1=1
| RD1-score03-2=1
| RD1-score03-3=
| RD1-seed04=
| RD1-team04= E Rodina
| RD1-score04-1=6
| RD1-score04-2=6
| RD1-score04-3=

| RD1-seed05=
| RD1-team05= R Hogenkamp
| RD1-score05-1=6
| RD1-score05-2=6
| RD1-score05-3=
| RD1-seed06=
| RD1-team06= M Minella
| RD1-score06-1=3
| RD1-score06-2=3
| RD1-score06-3=

| RD1-seed07=Q
| RD1-team07= T Korpatsch
| RD1-score07-1=4
| RD1-score07-2=4
| RD1-score07-3=
| RD1-seed08=5
| RD1-team08= A Konjuh
| RD1-score08-1=6
| RD1-score08-2=6
| RD1-score08-3=

| RD1-seed09=3
| RD1-team09= K Bertens
| RD1-score09-1=66
| RD1-score09-2=6
| RD1-score09-3=2
| RD1-seed10=
| RD1-team10= A Petkovic
| RD1-score10-1=78
| RD1-score10-2=2
| RD1-score10-3=6

| RD1-seed11=
| RD1-team11= N Vikhlyantseva
| RD1-score11-1=6
| RD1-score11-2=6
| RD1-score11-3=
| RD1-seed12=Q
| RD1-team12= C Lister
| RD1-score12-1=1
| RD1-score12-2=4
| RD1-score12-3=

| RD1-seed13=Q
| RD1-team13= A Hlaváčková
| RD1-score13-1=6
| RD1-score13-2=3
| RD1-score13-3=6
| RD1-seed14=LL
| RD1-team14= A Muhammad
| RD1-score14-1=3
| RD1-score14-2=6
| RD1-score14-3=4

| RD1-seed15=WC
| RD1-team15= A Rus
| RD1-score15-1=5
| RD1-score15-2=6
| RD1-score15-3=6
| RD1-seed16=6
| RD1-team16= T Babos
| RD1-score16-1=7
| RD1-score16-2=2
| RD1-score16-3=3

| RD2-seed01=Q
| RD2-team01= A Lottner
| RD2-score01-1=5
| RD2-score01-2=3
| RD2-score01-3=
| RD2-seed02=
| RD2-team02= E Rodina
| RD2-score02-1=7
| RD2-score02-2=6
| RD2-score02-3=

| RD2-seed03=
| RD2-team03= R Hogenkamp
| RD2-score03-1=6
| RD2-score03-2=3
| RD2-score03-3=4
| RD2-seed04=5
| RD2-team04= A Konjuh 
| RD2-score04-1=4
| RD2-score04-2=6
| RD2-score04-3=6

| RD2-seed05=
| RD2-team05= A Petkovic
| RD2-score05-1=3
| RD2-score05-2=7
| RD2-score05-3=2
| RD2-seed06=
| RD2-team06= N Vikhlyantseva
| RD2-score06-1=6
| RD2-score06-2=5
| RD2-score06-3=6

| RD2-seed07=Q
| RD2-team07= A Hlaváčková
| RD2-score07-1=2
| RD2-score07-2=5
| RD2-score07-3=
| RD2-seed08=WC
| RD2-team08= A Rus
| RD2-score08-1=6
| RD2-score08-2=7
| RD2-score08-3=

| RD3-seed01=
| RD3-team01= E Rodina
| RD3-score01-1=3
| RD3-score01-2=77
| RD3-score01-3=610
| RD3-seed02=5
| RD3-team02= A Konjuh
| RD3-score02-1=6
| RD3-score02-2=64| RD3-score02-3=712| RD3-seed03=
| RD3-team03=  N Vikhlyantseva| RD3-score03-1=6| RD3-score03-2=6| RD3-score03-3=
| RD3-seed04=WC
| RD3-team04= A Rus
| RD3-score04-1=3
| RD3-score04-2=2
| RD3-score04-3=

| RD4-seed01=5
| RD4-team01= A Konjuh
| RD4-score01-1=3
| RD4-score01-2=5
| RD4-score01-3=
| RD4-seed02=
| RD4-team02=  N Vikhlyantseva| RD4-score02-1=6| RD4-score02-2=7| RD4-score02-3=
}}

Bottom half

Qualifying

Seeds

Qualifiers

Lucky loser
  Asia Muhammad'''

Draw

First qualifier

Second qualifier

Third qualifier

Fourth qualifier

Fifth qualifier

Sixth qualifier

References
 Main draw
 Qualifying draw

Ricoh Openandnbsp;- Singles
2017 Women's Singles